Poromycena hanedai is a species of agaric fungus in the family Mycenaceae. Found in Japan, the species was first described by Kobayasi in 1951. It is bioluminescent.

See also
List of bioluminescent fungi

References

External links 

Mycenaceae
Bioluminescent fungi
Fungi described in 1951
Fungi of Asia